In metalworking, forming is the fashioning of metal parts and objects through mechanical deformation; the workpiece is reshaped without adding or removing material, and its mass remains unchanged. Forming operates on the materials science principle of plastic deformation, where the physical shape of a material is permanently deformed.

Characteristics
Metal forming tends to have more uniform characteristics across its subprocesses than its contemporary processes, cutting and joining. 

On the industrial scale, forming is characterized by:
 Very high loads and stresses required, between 50 and 
 Large, heavy, and expensive machinery in order to accommodate such high stresses and loads
 Production runs with many parts, to maximize the economy of production and compensate for the expense of the machine tools

Forming processes
Forming processes tend to be categorised by differences in effective stresses. These categories and descriptions are highly simplified, since the stresses operating at a local level in any given process are very complex and may involve many varieties of stresses operating simultaneously, or it may involve stresses which change over the course of the operation.

Compressive forming involves those processes where the primary means of plastic deformation is uni- or multiaxial compressive loading.

Rolling, where the material is passed through a pair of rollers
Extrusion, where the material is pushed through an orifice
Die forming, where the material is stamped by a press around or onto a die
Forging, where the material is shaped by localized compressive forces
Indenting, where a tool is pressed into the workpiece

Tensile forming
Tensile forming involves those processes where the primary means of plastic deformation is uni- or multiaxial tensile stress.

Stretching, where a tensile load is applied along the longitudinal axis of the workpiece
Expanding, where the circumference of a hollow body is increased by tangential loading
Recessing, where depressions and holes are formed through tensile loading

Combined tensile and compressive forming
This category of forming processes involves those operations where the primary means of plastic deformation involves both tensile stresses and compressive loads.

Pulling through a die
Tandem rolling mill
Deep drawing
Spinning
Flange forming
Upset bulging

Bending

This category of forming processes involves those operations where the primary means of plastic deformation is a bending load.

Shearing

This category of forming processes involves those operations where the primary means of plastic deformation is a shearing load.

Notes

References

See also
The Forming section of List of manufacturing processes
 Ferrous metallurgy
 Moulding
 Pressing

Metalworking
Metal forming